C. frontalis may refer to:
 Chortophila frontalis, a synonym for Delia radicum, the cabbage fly, cabbage root fly, root fly or turnip fly, a pest of crops
 Corythosaurus frontalis, a synonym for Lambeosaurus, a dinosaur species

See also
 Frontalis (disambiguation)